The Ryanverse is a term for the political drama media franchise created by author Tom Clancy centering on the character of Jack Ryan and the fictional universe featuring Jack and other characters, such as John Clark and Domingo Chavez.

Novels
The first book written to feature Jack Ryan was The Hunt for Red October.

By publication date
Books in the order in which they were written:

 The Hunt for Red October (1984)
 Patriot Games (1987)
 The Cardinal of the Kremlin (1988)
 Clear and Present Danger (1989)
 The Sum of All Fears (1991)
 Without Remorse (1993)
 Debt of Honor (1994)
 Executive Orders (1996)
 Rainbow Six (1998)
 The Bear and the Dragon (2000)
 Red Rabbit (2002)
 The Teeth of the Tiger (2003)
 Dead or Alive (2010, with Grant Blackwood)
 Against All Enemies (2011, with Peter Telep)
 Locked On (2011, with Mark Greaney)
 Threat Vector (2012, with Mark Greaney)
 Command Authority (2013, with Mark Greaney)
 Search and Destroy (Cancelled, with Peter Telep)

Post-Clancy Ryanverse novels
 Support and Defend (2014, by Mark Greaney)
 Full Force and Effect (2014, by Mark Greaney)
 Under Fire (2015, by Grant Blackwood)
 Commander in Chief (2015, by Mark Greaney)
 Duty and Honor (2016, by Grant Blackwood)
 True Faith and Allegiance (2016, by Mark Greaney)
 Point of Contact (2017, by Mike Maden)
 Power and Empire (2017, by Marc Cameron)
 Line of Sight (2018, by Mike Maden)
 Oath of Office (2018, by Marc Cameron)
 Enemy Contact (2019, by Mike Maden)
 Code of Honor (2019, by Marc Cameron)
 Firing Point (2020, by Mike Maden)
 Shadow of the Dragon (2020, by Marc Cameron)
 Target Acquired (2021, by Don Bentley)
 Chain of Command (2021, by Marc Cameron)
 Zero Hour (2022, by Don Bentley)
 Red Winter (2022, by Marc Cameron)
 Flash Point (forthcoming 2023, by Don Bentley)

Chronology
In the order in which they occur in the storyline (and rough estimates of when they occur):
 Without Remorse - Begins in late 1969 in the aftermath of Hurricane Camille and continues the following spring in 1970. Epilogue is titled "February 12, 1973".
 Patriot Games - Begins in 1981 and continues through summer 1982 based on a reference to Ryan's age, which is 31 at the beginning of the novel. Roughly fits with a reference to the Princess of Wales's first child being a boy and a few months old, since Prince William was born in 1982. Discrepancies include the reference to a van having a likely year of manufacture of 1984 and a reference to crime data of 1985. The subsequent events of Red Rabbit would seem to push its date back to 1981, rather than 1982.
 Red Rabbit - Presumably starts in the spring of 1982 as Jack Ryan Jr.'s age in the novel is given as 5 months, although the main action explicitly starts on August 15. Discrepancies between 1982 in the Ryanverse and in actual events, aside from the date of the attempt on the Pope's life, include the actual death of Mikhail Suslov in January 1982, frequent references to Transformers which did not appear until 1984, the fact that the Baltimore Orioles played against the Philadelphia Phillies in the World Series in 1983, the Baltimore Colts relocation to Indianapolis not occurring until 1984, and a reference to Coke Classic which did not debut until the summer of 1985.
 The Hunt for Red October - 1984. However, the calendar used is for 1982 and Ryan is spending his first Christmas in London, having arrived in the previous novel. 
 Red Winter - 1985
 The Cardinal of the Kremlin - 1986. The first chapter is set in January and states that Ryan is 35 years old. It also has references to the other books set earlier. For example, the Foleys have been in Moscow for almost four years. 
 Clear and Present Danger - 1988. The book refers to Jack's age as under 40.  Troops are sent into Colombia to fight against the Medellín Cartel and reduce drug shipments to America.
 The Sum of All Fears - 1990–1991. The book occurs after the Persian Gulf War and before the dissolution of the Soviet Union. It is implied that both events occur at the same time in the Ryan universe as in actual event in 1991. In the earlier chapters, it states that it had almost been two Novembers since President Fowler had been elected, making the beginning set in 1990. The video game Rainbow Six puts the atomic detonation in Denver as having occurred in 1989. (The film adaption is set after the break-up of the Soviet Union.)
 Debt of Honor - 1995–1996. The end of the novel occurs eleven months before the 1997 presidential inauguration. Of interest, but not crucial to the plot of this or further books is that North and South Korea were said to be unified at some point between The Sum of All Fears and this book.
 Executive Orders - 1997-1998
 Rainbow Six - 1999-2001. The novel is stated to take place over a year and a half after the Ebola attack from the previous novel. The 2000 Summer Olympics is also the site of an attempted bioweapon attack with a modified strain of the Ebola virus. The epilogue of the novel is stated to take place six months later.
The Bear and the Dragon - 2002.  It is explicitly mentioned multiple times that the ending of Debt of Honor occurred fifteen months before the start of this book, putting the timing somewhere between 1997-1998.  However, this seems to be an oversight by the author.  Rainbow exists and is discussed as well, denoting that Rainbow Six is this book's predecessor both chronologically and by publication date.
 The Teeth of the Tiger - 2006, based on the age of Jack Ryan Jr. The U.S. is now engaged in a global war on terrorism, in response to the September 11 attacks, which occurred in the Ryan universe as they did in the real world.  It is mentioned that the wars in Afghanistan and Iraq occurred in the Ryan universe continuity, and that the Jerusalem Treaty signed in The Sum of All Fears was not entirely successful as some Israelis and Palestinians continue fighting each other.
 Dead or Alive - 2007, based on Jack Ryan's announcement that he would run against Ed Kealty for President "in the coming year". The Umayyad Revolutionary Council (the Ryan universe version of Al-Qaeda) and its leader "The Emir" (based on Osama bin Laden) plan a string of major attacks on the U.S. The wars in Afghanistan and Iraq continue, as in our timeline, and President Kealty is in the process of withdrawing U.S. troops from Iraq. A character decoding encrypted messages explicitly refers to the date as May 2010, but this must be seen as a contradiction in the Jack Ryan continuity as Ed Kealty is a one term president (2005-2008).
 Against All Enemies - 2008.  However, the novel uses the 2010 calendar.
 Locked On - 2008, based on Jack Ryan Sr.'s campaign for re-election. Jack Ryan Sr. is running for president against incumbent Ed Kealty, who wants to serve a second term (2009-2012). The election happening in this book requires the events take place in 2008.
 Threat Vector - 2009, explicitly stated as six months after the previous novel. Ryan Sr. has been sworn in as president of the United States after having been elected the previous year.
 Command Authority - 2010, explicitly states that Ryan Sr. is in the second year of his second presidential term. It is implied the novel takes place about five months after the events of Threat Vector in the springtime. Based on the timelines of previous books, the 'Thirty years earlier' chapters must still take place in 1983 (and are therefore actually 27 years earlier).
 Support and Defend - 2010. The Campus is on operational stand down following the events of Command Authority. Dom Caruso is stated as being 32 years old. Brian's death is mentioned as taking place over two years earlier. Ethan Ross had worked at the White House for three years under two administrations.
 Full Force and Effect - 2010, based on the ages of John Clark (66) and Ding Chavez (47). It is implied that the Vietnam operation takes place several months after the events of Command Authority and approximately one week after the end of Support and Defend. It is mentioned that Clark's torture in Locked On took place two years ago. Choi tells Ri, and it is also mentioned in a conversation between Ryan Sr. and Arnie Van Damm, that Ryan has two years of his presidential term left.
 Under Fire - 2010. The novel is written as though it takes place in late winter: it was sleeting in Washington and fake snow spray was used in Edinburgh. It is stated that the Forth Road Bridge tolls were reintroduced in February and that the seaside tourist season is three months away. However, the timelines of the next two novels set this sometime in late summer or early autumn.
 Commander in Chief - October 2010. It is explicitly stated that the novel takes place in October and the events of Full Force and Effect are implied throughout the book as taking place several months ago. This is contradicted by mentioning that the events of Command Authority took place 'a year earlier', Jack Ryan Jr. had worked for The Campus for five years, and John Clark's age is 67. It is also noted that Jack Ryan Jr. had known Ysabel for one month. The continued mention of October and the approaching winter verifies Under Fire and this novel are set at the end of 2010 - Duty and Honor also confirms that this is the case. Further contradicted as the book explicitly stays "It was Europe in 2016"
 Duty and Honor Spring 2011, based on the mention of the Lyon attacks taking place in January, at the same time Jack Ryan Jr. was on probation from The Campus. It is also noted this novel takes place several months after the events of Commander in Chief, therefore confirming that Commander in Chief and Under Fire actually took place in the last quarter of 2010.
 True Faith and Allegiance - May to June 2011. It is stated the beginning of the novel takes place 7 months after the events of Commander in Chief. John Clark is still aged 67. Adara and Dom have been dating for a year. It is also mentioned that it is 'well over a year' since the events of Command Authority, the events of Threat Vector took place 'a couple of years back', and the events of Full Force and Effect took happened 'last year'. In a conversation, Ryan Jr tells his father that in two years he will no longer be president. Contradictions are Alex Dalca's age and stated year of birth. Also Gerry Hendley says that Laird was killed in 2017. Later on in the novel, Sally Ryan is implied to be in her early to mid thirties, which ties in with the 2011 date.
 Point of Contact - 2012. It is explicitly stated that the events of True Faith and Allegiance took place last year and the events of Full Force and Effect happened two years ago. Jack Jr.'s age is implied to be under 30, which is a slight contradiction.
 Power and Empire (?)
 Line of Sight (?)
 Oath of Office (?)
 Enemy Contact (?)
 Code of Honor (?)
 Firing Point - 2020. President Ryan explicitly states that it has been nineteen years since the start of the War in Afghanistan during a meeting with his cabinet. 
 Shadow of the Dragon (?)
 Target Acquired (?)
 Chain of Command (?)
 Zero Hour (?)

Characters

Main
The key characters in the Ryanverse include:
 Jack Ryan: The son of a Baltimore police detective and a nurse, Ryan is a former U.S. Marine and stockbroker who becomes a history teacher at the United States Naval Academy in Annapolis, Maryland. Ryan later joins the Central Intelligence Agency as analyst and occasional field officer, eventually leaving it as Deputy Director. He later served as National Security Advisor and Vice President before suddenly becoming President of the United States following a terrorist attack on the United States Capitol. Ryan went on to serve two non-consecutive terms and mostly dealt with international crises in Europe, the Middle East, Asia, and Africa.
 John Clark: A former Navy SEAL and Chief Petty Officer as John Terrence Kelly, he became an operations officer for the CIA after faking his death and adopting the Clark identity, and at one point served as Ryan’s driver and bodyguard. During Ryan's first term as president, Clark served as director of a multinational counter-terrorism unit code-named Rainbow, which is composed of elite soldiers from countries part of the North Atlantic Treaty Organization. After retiring from CIA and Rainbow, he then worked for The Campus, an off-the-books intelligence organization created by President Ryan, later acquiring a higher position as director of operations. Clark has been described by his creator as "Ryan’s dark side" and "more inclined to take physical action than Jack is."
 Domingo “Ding” Chavez: Born and raised in Los Angeles, Chavez enlisted in the United States Army to escape street life. While on a covert operation against a drug cartel in Colombia, he meets Clark, who becomes his mentor. He is then recruited into the CIA as an operations officer, and is usually paired with his eventual father-in-law on several covert missions. When Clark becomes head of Rainbow, Chavez is assigned as leader of one of the counterterror organization's two assault teams. After retiring from the CIA and Rainbow, Chavez joins The Campus as an operations officer, later acquiring a senior status.
 Daniel E. “Dan” Murray: A veteran FBI agent, Murray is assigned to a partnership with MI5 in England where he meets Ryan in Patriot Games. Murray becomes one of Ryan’s greatest allies, helping him throughout several novels.
 Vice Admiral James Greer: Deputy Director of the CIA and Ryan’s mentor. Greer is known for his sense of humor and kindness. Greer often gives Ryan advice and aids him to his best ability. Greer dies of pancreatic cancer in Clear and Present Danger.

Some of the key characters have been portrayed in the following movies and television series:

Cast

Presidents
A total of six presidents are depicted in the Ryanverse, although only five are named:
 The unnamed man referred to as "the President" or later by his Secret Service codename "Wrangler", is first introduced in The Hunt for Red October; he remains in office through The Cardinal of the Kremlin, and Clear and Present Danger.  At the end of the last novel, he runs for reelection and is defeated. 
 J. Robert Fowler, former governor of Ohio, who defeats the incumbent at the end of Clear and Present Danger and is in office during The Sum of All Fears.  After his failure to handle the Denver crisis nearly results in nuclear war, he resigns from office at the end of the novel.
 Roger Durling, Fowler's vice-president, former governor of California and a Vietnam veteran with service in the 82nd Airborne Division.  Durling replaces Fowler when the latter resigns, and is the President in Debt of Honor. He nearly completes Fowler's term as President and is planning a reelection campaign when he is killed along with most of the government when a Japanese jetliner is crashed into the Capitol Building.
 John Patrick Ryan is confirmed as Durling's new vice president at the end of Debt of Honor, and is sworn in as President when Durling is murdered on the same day.  His claim to the presidency is contested by Durling's former vice president Ed Kealty in Executive Orders, but the courts eventually rule in Ryan's favor. He is mentioned during Rainbow Six, although he never appears and is depicted as President in The Bear and the Dragon. Ryan chooses not to run for re-election between the events of The Bear and The Dragon and The Teeth of The Tiger.  
 Robert Jefferson "Robby" Jackson succeeded Ryan as President of the United States after Ryan retired (as described in The Teeth of the Tiger), with Ryan believing he could leave the country in Robby's capable hands. After serving out the remainder of Ryan's term, Robby campaigned for his own re-election. While travelling in Mississippi, however, Jackson was assassinated by a 67-year-old man who was a member of the Ku Klux Klan; Duane Farmer. Farmer was taken alive and swiftly executed for his crimes.
 Edward Jonathan Kealty: Durling's former vice-president, replaced by Jack Ryan after a sex scandal. When incumbent president Robby Jackson is assassinated while campaigning, Kealty is elected President in his own right, a position he holds in The Teeth of the Tiger, Dead or Alive, and Locked On.
 John Patrick Ryan,: Begins his campaign for re-election during the events of Dead or Alive, defeats Kealty by a narrow margin in Locked On and assumes office prior to the events of Threat Vector. He is depicted as President in all subsequent Ryanverse novels.

Various books contain references to both the Reagan Presidency and the George H. W. Bush Presidency as if they had happened

The Campus
Beginning with The Teeth of the Tiger, Ryanverse novels feature off-the-books intelligence organization The Campus while featuring Jack Ryan Sr. as more of a background character.  They follow his son Jack Ryan Jr. and fellow colleagues on several counter-terrorism missions. Hendley Associates, a private trading and arbitrage company, serves as a legitimate cover for the organization, or the "white side". They fund The Campus's intelligence operations by stock market trades influenced by captured intelligence data, thus removing federal oversight and allowing free rein in the Campus's operations.

Characters
 Gerald Paul "Gerry" Hendley Jr.: Founder & CEO. A former Democratic senator from South Carolina, Hendley was tasked by then-President Ryan to lead The Campus and its cover Hendley Associates.  
 Jerry Rounds: Chief of strategic planning / director of intelligence
 Rick Bell: Chief of analysis
 Sam Granger: Director of operations. Later killed by the Chinese in Threat Vector.
 John Clark: Director of operations. He was employed by The Campus after retiring from the CIA and Rainbow in Dead or Alive, and after a brief retirement replaces Granger as operations head in Command Authority.
 Gavin Biery: Director of information technology
 Lisanne Robertson: Director of transportation. Introduced in Power and Empire.
 Domingo "Ding" Chavez: Senior operations officer. Along with Clark, he was recruited by The Campus after retiring from the CIA and Rainbow. Ding helps train new agents for the Campus as well and participates in field operations.
 Dominic "Enzo" Caruso:  Operations officer and former FBI special agent
 Brian "Aldo" Caruso: Operations officer and former Marine Major. Later dies in an operation in Libya in Dead or Alive.
 Jack Ryan Jr.: Intelligence analyst and operations officer. Originally an analyst, he becomes more involved in field operations from Dead or Alive onwards, much to the concern of his father.
 Sam Driscoll: Operations officer and former Army Ranger. He was recruited by Clark after the Kealty administration dropped murder charges against him for killing sleeping Middle Eastern terrorists in a cave in Pakistan during the hunt for the Emir in Dead or Alive. Later dies in an operation in Mexico City in Full Force and Effect.
 Adara Sherman: Operations officer in True Faith and Allegiance and former director of transportation. She currently has a relationship with Caruso.
 Bartosz "Barry" Jankowski (call sign "Midas"): Operations officer and former Delta Force operator. Recruited by Clark in True Faith and Allegiance.
 Tony Wills: Intelligence analyst who originally trained Jack Ryan Jr. on the intelligence side of The Campus
 Helen Reid: Pilot of Hendley Associates's Gulfstream G550
 Chester "Country" Hicks: Co-pilot of Hendley Associates's Gulfstream G550

In other media

Films

Television

It was announced by Deadline that Carlton Cuse and Graham Roland would be working with Michael Bay and his production company Platinum Dunes and Paramount Television on a Jack Ryan TV series for Amazon. On April 29, 2016, Deadline announced that John Krasinski will star as Jack Ryan in the series. On August 16, 2016, Amazon Studios announced they had given a series order for a 10-episode first season of Tom Clancy's Jack Ryan. On November 4, 2016, Abbie Cornish was cast as Cathy Muller in the series. On January 6, 2017, it was reported that Morten Tyldum would direct the pilot. In February 2017, it was announced that The Americans director Daniel Sackheim would direct multiple episodes and produce the series. The series, said to be inspired by the Harrison Ford Jack Ryan films, premiered on August 31, 2018. Four months earlier, on April 24, 2018, Amazon had renewed the series for season two, which is set in South America, and it was renewed for a third season on February 13, 2019. In May 2022, before the release of the third season, it was confirmed the series would be renewed for a fourth and final season.

Video games
Many video games based on the Ryanverse have been made, some based on the novels, some on the films, some on the spin-offs.

 The Hunt for Red October (1987): Based on the book The Hunt for Red October. It was released for the Atari ST, Amiga, Apple II, ZX Spectrum, MSX, Commodore 64 and IBM PC. The player must navigate the Red October towards U.S. waters while avoiding the Soviet Navy. The game is a combination of submarine simulator and strategy game.
 The Hunt for Red October (1990): Based on the movie The Hunt for Red October. It was released for the Amiga, Amstrad CPC, Atari ST, Commodore 64, MS-DOS, and ZX Spectrum. The game features five action sequences including jumping from a helicopter and navigating submarines through deep channels and avoiding from many obstacles.
 The Sum of All Fears (2002): Based on the movie The Sum of All Fears.  It was released for Microsoft Windows, Game Boy Advance, PlayStation 2, and the GameCube. It is a tactical first-person shooter where various mission must be completed including saving hostages in a Charleston, West Virginia television station, and shutting down the operations of a West Virginian militia.

Rainbow Six games

In addition Tom Clancy created a multi-media franchise about a fictional international counter-terrorist unit called "Rainbow". The franchise began with Clancy's novel Rainbow Six, which was adapted into a series of tactical first-person shooter video games.

Bibliography

References

External links

 
Canons (fiction)
Mass media franchises introduced in 1984
Novels by Tom Clancy
Novel series
Tom Clancy